Toronto is an extinct town in Helt Township, Vermillion County, in the U.S. state of Indiana. The site is on Indiana State Road 71 near the Illinois and Indiana border.

A few buildings in the community exist, and it is still cited by the USGS.

History

A post office was established at Toronto in 1838, and remained in operation until it was discontinued in 1912.

Geography

References

Former populated places in Vermillion County, Indiana
Former populated places in Indiana